Long Island Farm is a historic farmstead at 2200 Cromwell Bridge Road in Parkville, Maryland.  The main house is a rambling multi-part building whose oldest part is said to date to 1764, when Isaac Risteau purchased the property.  The main eastern block of the house is built of stone and is five bays wide, but shows evidence that it once consisted of several separate sections that were built separately and then combined.  The western block is a modern 20th century addition.  The farmstead was associated with the Risteau and Jenifer families for over two centuries.

Long Island Farm was listed on the National Register of Historic Places in 2010.

See also
National Register of Historic Places listings in Baltimore County, Maryland

References

External links
, at Maryland Historical Trust

Houses in Baltimore County, Maryland
Houses on the National Register of Historic Places in Maryland
Houses completed in 1770
National Register of Historic Places in Baltimore County, Maryland
1770 establishments in Maryland